The 12th Legislative Assembly of Quebec was the provincial legislature in Quebec, Canada that existed from June 8, 1908, to May 15, 1912. The Quebec Liberal Party led by Lomer Gouin was the governing party.

Seats per political party

 After the 1908 elections

Member list

This was the list of members of the Legislative Assembly of Quebec that were elected in the 1908 election:

Other elected MLAs

Other MLAs were elected in this mandate during by-elections

 Jean-Baptiste Carbonneau, Quebec Liberal Party, Lac St-Jean, October 14, 1908 
 Joseph-Edmond Robert, Quebec Liberal Party, Rouville, October 26, 1908 
 Napoléon Séguin, Quebec Liberal Party, Montréal division no. 1, December 21, 1908 
 Honoré Mercier Jr., Quebec Liberal Party, Châteauguay, December 28, 1908 
 Michael James Walsh, Quebec Liberal Party, Montréal division no. 6, December 28, 1908 
 Eugène Leclerc, Quebec Liberal Party, Québec Centre, December 28, 1908  
 Antonin Galipeault, Quebec Liberal Party, Bellechasse, February 2, 1909 
 Lesieur Desaulniers, Quebec Liberal Party, Chambly, November 12, 1909 
 Clement Robillard, Quebec Liberal Party, Montréal division no. 2, November 12, 1909 
 Joseph-Alphonse Langlois, Parti ouvrier, St. Sauveur, November 12, 1909 
 Louis-Auguste Dupuis, Quebec Liberal Party, Kamouraska, December 6, 1909 
 Joseph-Léonide Perron, Quebec Liberal Party, Gaspé, February 17, 1910 
 John Hay, Quebec Liberal Party, Argenteuil, March 5, 1910 
 Louis-Jules Allard, Quebec Liberal Party, Drummond, March 5, 1910 
 Marcellin Robert, Quebec Liberal Party, St. Jean, December 29, 1910 
 Calixte-Émile Therrien, Quebec Liberal Party, Sherbrooke, August 17, 1911 
 Laetare Roy, Quebec Liberal Party, Lévis, September 21, 1911

Cabinet Ministers

 Prime Minister and Executive Council President: Lomer Gouin
 Agriculture: Jules Allard (1908–1909), Jérémie-Louis Décarie (1909), Joseph-Edouard Caron (1909–1912)
 Colonisation, Mines and Fishing: Charles Devlin Ramsey
 Public Works and Labor: Louis-Alexandre Taschereau 
 Lands and Forests: Adélard Turgeon (1908–1909), Jules Allard (1909–1912)
 Roads: Joseph-Édouard Caron (1912)
 Attorney General:Lomer Gouin
 Provincial secretary: Louis-Rodolphe Roy (1908–1909), Louis-Jérémie Décarie (1909–1912)
 Treasurer: William Alexander Weir (1908–1910), Peter Samuel George MacKenzie (1910–1912)
 Members without portfolios: Joseph-Édouard Caron (1909), Narcisse Pérodeau (1910–1912)

New electoral districts

The electoral map was reformed in 1912 just a few months prior to the general elections later that year.

 Chicoutimi was formed after being split from Saguenay which itself merged with Charlevoix to form Charlevoix-Saguenay.
 Frontenac was formed from parts of Beauce and Compton
 Labelle was formed from parts of Ottawa
 Hochelaga was split into five new districts : Maisonneuve, Montréal-Hochelaga, Westmount, Montréal-Laurier and Montréal-Dorion.
 Montréal division no. 6 was renamed Montréal–Sainte-Anne.
 Montréal division no. 1 was renamed Montréal–Sainte-Marie.
 Montréal division no. 5 was renamed Montréal–Saint-Georges.
 Montréal division no. 2 was renamed Montréal–Saint-Jacques.
 Montréal division no. 4 was renamed Montréal–Saint-Laurent.
 Montréal division no. 3 was renamed Montréal–Saint-Louis.
 Témiscamingue was created from parts of Pontiac.

References
 1908 election results
 List of historical Cabinet Ministers

Notes

12